Yangsong Town, is a town on southeastern Huairou District, Beijing, China. It borders Beifang Town to its north, Mulin and Beixiaoying Towns to its southeast, as well as Niulanshan and Miaocheng Towns to its southwest. As of 2020, its total population was 31,270.

History

Administrative divisions 
As of the year 2021, Yangsong Town consisted of 16 subdivisions, where one was a community, and 15 were villages:

Gallery

See also 

 List of township-level divisions of Beijing

References 

Huairou District
Towns in Beijing